The Complete BBC Sessions is a two disc compilation album released by the British band Cast. Comprising six live performances from 1995 to 1999, the album was released by Universal Records on 26 February 2007.

Track listing
All songs written by John Power.

Disc one
Evening Sessions 24/4/95
 "Four Walls" – 3:22
 "Back of My Mind" – 3:11
 "Finetime" – 3:07
 "Follow Me Down" – 3:21
Mark Radcliffe 7/8/95
 "Alright" – 3:25
 "Sandstorm" – 2:46
 "Finetime" – 3:02
 "Reflections" – 3:03
Simon Mayo 15/10/96
 "Finetime" – 3:19
 "Flying" – 4:08
Mary Anne Hobbs 27/3/97
 "Guiding Star" –  3:46
 "Walkaway" – 4:20
 "Sandstorm" – 2:58
 "Free Me" – 4:37

Disc two
Simon Mayo 28/10/97
 "Free Me" – 4:44
 "Guiding Star" – 3:56
Lamacq Live 19/4/99
 "Company Man" – 3:41
 "Compared to You" – 3:37
 "Dreamer" – 3:32
 "She Falls" – 3:30
 "Beat Mama" – 4:08
 "Higher" – 4:16
 "Alien" – 5:13
 "The Feeling Remains" – 3:48
 "Hideaway" – 6:25

References

External links

Cast (band) albums
2007 compilation albums
2007 live albums
Universal Records compilation albums
Universal Records live albums